The 2021 South Australian National Football League (SANFL) grand final was an Australian rules football match that was played at Adelaide Oval on Sunday, 3 October to determine the premiers for the 2021 SANFL season. 

The match was contested by Woodville-West Torrens and Glenelg. It was the first grand final meeting between the two clubs since the merger of the Woodville and West Torrens football clubs in 1991. 

Woodville-West Torrens defeated Glenelg by 67 points. Whilst Glenelg kicked 2 out of the first 3 goals, Woodville-West Torrens kicked 14 out of the next 16 to run away with the premiership. 

The win marked the 5th premiership for Woodville-West Torrens in their 30th year in the league, and the first time the club had ever gone back-to-back. The win also puts Woodville-West Torrens and Glenelg on the same amount of premiership victories - though Glenelg is 71 years older. With the loss, Glenelg also claims the worst Grand Final win ratio of any club with 26.32% having lost 14 out of their 19 Grand Final appearances.

Jack Hayes of Woodville-West Torrens was awarded the Jack Oatey Medal as the best player on ground.

References 

SANFL Grand Finals
SANFL Grand Final, 2021